The 1861 Grand National was the 23rd renewal of the Grand National horse race that took place at Aintree near Liverpool, England, on 13 March 1861.

Finishing Order

Non-finishers

References

 1861
Grand National
Grand National
19th century in Lancashire
March 1861 sports events